Ralph Milbanke Hudson (died 6 March 1938) was an English shipowner and politician.

Life
He was born in 1848 or 1849 at Boldon, the son of Ralph Milbanke Hudson the elder, of Oak Lea, Witton Gilbert, County Durham. He was educated privately and abroad.

Hudson joined the family shipowning business, R. M. Hudson & Sons, of Tavistock House, Sunderland. From 1882 he was a member of the River Wear Commissioners, representing coal owners. 

In 1895, the company, with other British partners, bought into meat-packing premises on the River Plate; and the SS Meath and SS Wexford began in the meat trade with Argentina, to 1886, followed by a period where they were chartered more generally. By 1912, R. M. Hudson & Sons was running a regular cargo trade with Argentina.

He held the seat until 1922. 

He represented Sunderland with Lloyds Register of Shipping, was chairman of the finance committee of the Shipping Federation, and a member of the council of the International Shipping Federation.

Death
Hudson died at Yarm, aged 89, on 6 March 1938.

Family
Hudson married, in 1883, Eliza Westropp Palliser, daughter of Graham Palliser of Plymouth.

Notes

1840s births
Date of birth unknown
1938 deaths
Conservative Party (UK) MPs for English constituencies
English businesspeople
People from The Boldons
Politicians from Tyne and Wear
Businesspeople from Tyne and Wear
UK MPs 1918–1922